Ṅ (lowercase ṅ) is a letter of the Latin alphabet, formed by N with the addition of a dot above. 

The letter is used in Venda and Emilian-Romagnol for the voiced velar nasal, corresponding to the pronunciation of the English digraph "ng" in final position. 

Furthermore, the letter is used in some transliteration systems of South Asian languages. The letter is used in the International Alphabet of Sanskrit Transliteration for the "ng" sound corresponding to the Indian letters ङ / ঙ / ਙ / ઙ / ଙ / ங / ఙ / ಙ / ങ / ඞ. The letter is also used in the ISO 9 transliteration of the Cyrillic letter Ҥ.

Usage in various languages

Emilian-Romagnol 
Ṅ is used in Emilian to represent [ŋ], e.g. faréṅna [faˈreŋːna] "flour". In Romagnol the letter has the same value, but its use is limited to linguistics.

Computer display

Unicode contains the Ṅ with the code points U+1E44 (uppercase) and U+1E45 (lowercase).

In TeX one can type the Ṅ with the commands \.N or \.n.

Latin letters with diacritics